The 2003 ICC Africa/East Asia-Pacific Under-19 Championship was a cricket tournament held in Namibia from 4–9 October 2003, during the 2003–04 international season. All matches were held in the capital Windhoek.

Papua New Guinea won the tournament by defeating Uganda in the final, with both teams qualifying for the 2004 Under-19 World Cup in Bangladesh. Kenyan batsman Malhar Patel led the competition in runs scored, while Papua New Guinea's William Harry and Uganda's Patrick Ochan took the most wickets.

The tournament was jointly organised by the African Cricket Association (ACA) and ICC East Asia-Pacific (EAP), the first time such an arrangement had occurred. Eight teams (six African and two EAP) participated, divided into two pools for the group stages. Another joint tournament was held in 2005, for the 2006 World Cup, but separate qualifying tournaments have been held since then – the ICC Africa Under-19 Championships and the EAP Under-19 Cricket Trophy.

Teams and qualification 
Both the African and the East Asia-Pacific regional governing bodies hosted qualifiers for the first time for the 2002 Under-19 World Cup in New Zealand. The 2001 Africa Under-19 Championship featured five teams, two of which (East and Central Africa and West Africa) were put up by regional bodies disbanded in 2003 (the East and Central Africa Cricket Conference and the West Africa Cricket Council). The 2001 EAP Under-19 Trophy featured three teams, one of which (Hong Kong) was a member of the Asian Cricket Council (ACC), and consequently not generally a participant in EAP tournaments.

Preparation

Group stage

Pool A

Pool B

Finals

7th-place playoff

5th-place playoff
Two semi-finals were held for the 5th-place playoff, with Nigeria defeating Fiji by 61 runs and Zambia defeating Tanzania by five wickets. The losing teams played each other in the 7th-place playoff.

3rd-place playoff

Final
Two semi-finals were held, with Uganda defeating Kenya by four wickets and Papua New Guinea defeating Namibia by four wickets. The losing teams played each other in the 3rd-place playoff.

Statistics

Most runs
The top five runscorers are included in this table, ranked by runs scored and then by batting average.

Source: CricketArchive

Most wickets

The top five wicket takers are listed in this table, ranked by wickets taken and then by bowling average. Information for some games is unavailable, and some statistics are consequently incomplete for some players (marked *):

Source: CricketArchive

References 

Under-19 regional cricket tournaments
Sport in Windhoek
International cricket competitions in 2003–04
Cri
International cricket competitions in Namibia
21st century in Windhoek